Regina Bari-Nagy (born 15 September 1990 in Budapest) is a retired Hungarian handballer.

Achievements
Nemzeti Bajnokság I:
Silver Medallist: 2009
Bronze Medallist: 2011
Magyar Kupa:
Silver Medallist: 2010
EHF Cup Winners' Cup:
Winner: 2011

References

External links
 Regina Bari-Nagy career statistics at Worldhandball

1990 births
Living people
Handball players from Budapest
Hungarian female handball players
Expatriate handball players
Hungarian expatriate sportspeople in Germany